Devis Rogers Epassy Mboka (born 2 February 1993) is a professional footballer who plays as a goalkeeper for Premier League club Southampton. Born in France, he represents the Cameroon national team internationally.

Early life
Epassy was born and raised in France.

Club career

Levadiakos
Epassy joined Levadiakos on 14 August 2017 from Épinal.

Lamia
On 29 January 2020, Epassy joined Lamia from Levadiakos on a three-year deal.

OFI
On 15 July 2021, Epassy agreed to join Greek Super League club OFI on a two-year deal. On 18 July 2021, OFI officially announced Epassy after signing a two-year contract with the club, as previously agreed.

Abha
On 6 August 2022, Epassy joined Saudi Arabian club Abha on a free transfer.

International career
Born in France, Epassy is of Cameroonian descent. He was called up to represent the Cameroon national team in June 2021. He debuted with Cameroon in a 0–0 friendly tie with Nigeria on 8 June 2021. He made his first appearance of the 2022 FIFA World Cup in 3-3 tie to Serbia in the Group stage of the tournament after original starting goalkeeper André Onana was sent home by manager Rigobert Song following a disagreement between the two of them. Epassy then kept a clean sheat in Cameroon's final game, a 1-0 win against perennial favorites Brazil.

Career statistics

Honours

Cameroon 

 Third AFCON Tournament 2021-22.

References

External links

PAS Lamia 1964 - Official website
Super League Greece Player Profile - Devis Epassy

1993 births
Living people
People from Soisy-sous-Montmorency
French sportspeople of Cameroonian descent
Citizens of Cameroon through descent
Cameroonian footballers
French footballers
Association football goalkeepers
Cameroon international footballers
2021 Africa Cup of Nations players
2022 FIFA World Cup players
Football League (Greece) players
Championnat National players
Championnat National 2 players
Championnat National 3 players
Segunda División B players
Super League Greece players
Super League Greece 2 players
Saudi Professional League players
US Avranches players
SAS Épinal players
Levadiakos F.C. players
PAS Lamia 1964 players
CD Guijuelo footballers
OFI Crete F.C. players
Abha Club players
Cameroonian expatriate footballers
French expatriate footballers
French expatriate sportspeople in Spain
Expatriate footballers in Spain
Cameroonian expatriate sportspeople in Greece
French expatriate sportspeople in Greece
Expatriate footballers in Greece
Cameroonian expatriate sportspeople in Saudi Arabia
French expatriate sportspeople in Saudi Arabia
Expatriate footballers in Saudi Arabia
Footballers from Val-d'Oise